United Auto Industries (United Motors) is a Pakistani automobile manufacturer based in Lahore, Punjab, Pakistan since 1999. It is Pakistan's second largest selling motorcycle brand after Atlas Honda, and claims to be the number one bike assembler of Chinese bikes in Pakistan.

History 
United Auto Industries (Pvt) Ltd. came into existence in 1999 by introducing economical 4-stroke motorcycles and Auto rickshaws with the brand name of UNITED.

United Auto is now engaged in manufacturing of loaders, scooters, rickshaws and bikes in Pakistan. It has plans to launch an 800cc car named "United Bravo" in September 2018 and a 1000cc light commercial vehicle in fall 2018 or mid 2019. In 2017, the United Auto Industries had applied for IPO for copyright of vehicles’ design and announced to launch 800cc and 1000cc vehicles in the country. The company is also looking for interested 3S dealership candidates for their upcoming vehicles. It has a joint venture with a Chinese automaker to produce these two new vehicles for the Pakistani market.

Operations in Pakistan 
In the first week of February 2022, United Motors announced a price hike of 6,000-10,000 on their motorbikes.Two weeks later, on February 16, the company increased the prices of their motorbikes.

The sales of United Auto Motorcycle plummeted by 40%, 36%, and 28% in FY22, with production dropping to 38,957 bikes in the first five months of the fiscal year, a massive decline of over 300% from the previous year's production of 136,720 units during July-November 2021.

However, in a move to spur sales, United Motors decreased its car prices and officially shared a new price list in August 2022.The company aimed to provide benefits to its customers through the decreased prices of their cars. Despite the decline in sales and production of motorcycles, United Motors took strategic steps to keep its customers satisfied and retain their loyalty.

Products

Cars
 United Bravo
 United Alpha

Commercial Vehicles
United Punjnad (Light pickup truck)

Motorcycles and Rickshaws70cc

United Bravo 800cc
United Scooty 100cc
United Jazba 100cc
United 125cc
United 125cc Deluxe
United 150cc (Ultimate Thrill)
United Motorcycle Rickshaw 100cc
United Auto Rickshaw 3 Seater 200cc
United Auto Rickshaw 6 Seater 200cc
United High Roof Pickup Rickshaw
United Loader 150cc
United Loader 150cc Deluxe
United Loader 150cc Deluxe Plus
United Loader 150cc Premier
United Auto Loader 200cc
United Motorcycle for Special Person

See also
 List of motorcycle manufacturers
 List of car manufacturers

References

External links 
 United Motorcycles
 United Motors
 United Lifestyle

Car manufacturers of Pakistan
Motorcycle manufacturers of Pakistan
Manufacturing companies based in Lahore
Vehicle manufacturing companies established in 1999
Pakistani brands
Pakistani companies established in 1999